The following highways are numbered 148:

Argentina
 National Route 148

Canada
 New Brunswick Route 148
 Ontario Highway 148
 Prince Edward Island Route 148
 Quebec Route 148

Costa Rica
 National Route 148

India
 National Highway 148 (India)

Italy
 State road 148

Japan
 Japan National Route 148
 Fukuoka Prefecture Route 148
 Nara Prefecture Route 148

Malaysia
 Malaysia Federal Route 148

United States
 Alabama State Route 148
 Arkansas Highway 148
 California State Route 148 (unbuilt)
 Connecticut Route 148
 Florida State Road 148 (former)
 County Road 148 (Hamilton County, Florida)
 Georgia State Route 148 (former)
 Hawaii Route 148
 Illinois Route 148
 Indiana State Road 148
 Iowa Highway 148
 K-148 (Kansas highway)
 Kentucky Route 148
 Louisiana Highway 148
 Maine State Route 148
 Maryland Route 148 (former)
 Massachusetts Route 148
 County Road 148 (Ramsey County, Minnesota)
 Missouri Route 148
 New York State Route 148
 County Route 148 (Broome County, New York)
 County Route 148 (Fulton County, New York)
 County Route 148 (Seneca County, New York)
 North Carolina Highway 148
 Ohio State Route 148
 Pennsylvania Route 148
 Tennessee State Route 148
 Texas State Highway 148
 Texas State Highway Spur 148
 Farm to Market Road 148
 Utah State Route 148
 Virginia State Route 148
 Wisconsin Highway 148 (former)

Territories
 Puerto Rico Highway 148